Arturo Robledo Ocampo (2 November 1930, Manizales, Colombia - 2007, Bogotá) was a Colombian architect.

He received a bachelor's from Instituto del Carmen in Bogotá in 1946 did postgraduate studies at Universidad Nacional de Colombia. His work is discussed in the book Arturo Robledo; La arquitecture como modo de vida by Beatriz Garcia Moreno.

His work includes houses of the neighborhood Polo Club (1957), with his firm Robledo, Drews & Castro, Parque Metropolitano Simón Bolívar, and El Parque Residecial Calle 100 (1993).

He is most known for his work on the Parque Metropolitano Simón Bolívar, the biggest and most important in Bogotá.

With his classmates Ignacio Piñeros and Hans Drews he wrote a thesis titles "Nuevo campus para la Universidad de los Andes" (New campus for the University of the Andes). After graduation, he worked in the firm of Cuéllar Serrano. He worked on the Banco Iteramericano de Desarrollo and with the Sociedad Robledo Drews y Castro Ltda.

In 1982 he worked on the master plan for the Parque Metropolitano Simón Bolívar. He is considered a visionary of the city designed with a large plaza. The design was done together with residential plans for  Nueva Santa Fe de Bogotá and Calle 100.

References

External links 
 Gabriel Escalante, del Archivo Histórico de la Universidad Nacional
 The man who revived the life of the S. Bolívar Park (en español)

Colombian architects
1930 births
2007 deaths